Alykes ("salt pans") may refer to several places in Greece:

Alykes, a municipality in the island of Zakynthos
Alykes, Achaea, a village in Achaea 
Alykes, Phthiotis, a village in Phthiotis 
Alykes, Samos, a village on Samos